Space Quest: Chapter I – The Sarien Encounter, commonly known as Space Quest I, is a graphic adventure game released in October 1986 by Sierra On-Line. It is the first game in the Space Quest series. It quickly became a hit, selling in excess of 100,000 copies. Total sales are believed to be around 200,000 to date, not including the many compilations it has been included in.

Space Quest was the brainchild of Sierra programmers Scott Murphy and Mark Crowe, who had worked on prior titles like King's Quest II, but had not designed their own game before. According to Murphy, "at that time (1985), everything at Sierra was so somber and had an almost medieval atmosphere. So we decided 'Why not make a fun, silly game?'" In 1992, Adventure Comics created a three issue comic, based on the game's plot.

Plot
Players of the original game are never told the hero's name, but are instead asked to enter their own. The default name of "Roger Wilco" — a reference to the radio communication, "Roger, Will Comply" — became the de facto name of the hero in the later games of the series.

Roger is a janitor on board the scientific spaceship Arcada within the Earnon galaxy which holds a powerful experimental device called the "Star Generator" (a thinly-veiled reference to the Genesis Device from Star Trek II: The Wrath of Khan). Roger emerges from an on-duty nap in a broom closet to find that the ship has been boarded and seized by the sinister Sariens. Using a keycard that he finds on the body of a dead crew member, he finds his way to an escape pod and escapes the Arcada.

After crash-landing, he finds himself in the dry and barren wasteland of the planet Kerona, hunted by a spider-droid dispatched by the Sariens. Roger makes his way through the desert and a system of caves and is greeted by a mysterious disembodied head, he is tasked with killing a monstrous creature called Orat in exchange for transportation. After succeeding in this task and in the evasion of the hunter droid, he returns to the alien head with proof of his success in the form of a piece of Orat's flesh. As a reward, he is allowed into an underground complex inhabited by other aliens of the same species, and is provided with a skimmer, a small hovercraft (a direct reference to the landspeeders in Star Wars).

Roger travels to a Ulence Flats (a direct reference to Star Wars' Mos Eisley), a desert town, in order to find a way off the planet. Roger wins enough money to buy a spaceship and a navigation droid by playing slot machines in a cantina.

He overhears from a bar customer the location of the Sariens' spaceship, the Deltaur, and flies to its coordinates. He then infiltrates the ship by, but not limited to, utilizing his jetpack, dodging a droid, climbing inside an air vent, locking himself in a trunk, getting put inside a washing machine, disguising himself as a Sarien by wearing one of the Sarien uniforms, and other tactful, creative methods. He then finds his way to the Star Generator and programs it to self-destruct, escaping the ship just before it explodes.

At the end of the game, Roger's efforts are rewarded when he receives the Golden Mop as a token of eternal gratitude from the people of Xenon (a reference to the planet from Blake's 7).

Gameplay

The game was created using Sierra's AGI engine and featured a pseudo-3D environment, allowing the character to move in front of and behind background objects. The primary means of input in Space Quest, as in many other AGI games, was through the use of a text parser for entering commands and use of the keypad or arrow keys for moving Roger Wilco around the screen. The Amiga, Apple IIGS, Atari ST and Mac versions of the game offered basic mouse support for movement as well. The game had a 160×200 resolution displaying 16 colors. Sound cards were not available in 1986 for the PC, so sound was played through the PC's internal speaker; owners of Tandy 1000, PCjr and Amiga computers would hear a three-voice soundtrack, while Apple IIGS owners were treated to a fifteen-voice soundtrack with notably richer sound.

A precursor of this game is the interactive fiction game Planetfall, created by Infocom, whose player-character is a lowly "Ensign Seventh Class" who does the lowest form of labor aboard a spaceship and who appears on the cover with a mop. Just as King's Quest adapted the text-adventure puzzle games set in a medieval world to a visual display, Space Quest did the same for the space puzzle game.

As a form of copy protection, coordinates in the VGA version of the game while in the escape pod as well as the rocket purchased at Tiny's Used Spaceships are only found in the manual. Also, the code for retrieving the cartridge aboard the Arcada can only be found in the manual. The AGI version had key disk protection where the user was required to insert the original game floppy on startup.

Sierra released three versions of Space Quest: the original 1986 AGI V2 release, the 1987 AGI V3 release, and the 1990 VGA release. Aside from minor sound and graphic differences, the PC, Amiga, Atari ST, and Apple IIGS versions are largely identical. The Mac version is considerably different, however, being monochrome and completely menu-driven. Space Quest I also had an 8-bit Apple II version for the IIe and IIc. This had no pull down menus and displayed all text at the bottom of the screen.

Along with King's Quest III, Space Quest was the first Sierra game to feature pull down menus, be hard disk installable, and not require a specially formatted save disk (except the Apple II version as noted above).

Reception
Compute! praised the Apple IIGS version's sound and graphics, stating that players "may think they're watching a cartoon". It concluded that the game "is one of the better new adventure games to arrive".

The game contains a number of characters which resemble musical acts and other popular characters. The owners of a couple complained that Sierra had used them without permission. Toys R Us complained about a robot shop named "Droids R Us", which Sierra changed to "Droids B Us"; the remake adds a character which resembles the toy company's mascot Geoffrey Giraffe. Rock band ZZ Top complained that a band seen briefly on stage resembled them – despite this, they re-appear in certain versions of the VGA remake.

According to Sierra On-Line, combined sales of the Space Quest series surpassed 1.2 million units by the end of March 1996.

Reviews
Tilt (May, 1987)
Tilt (Apr, 1987)
The Games Machine (Dec, 1987)
Computer and Video Games (Nov, 1987)
Joker Verlag präsentiert: Sonderheft (1993)
ST Format (Mar, 1995)
Commodore User (Sep, 1987)

Remake

Space Quest was eventually remade using Sierra's newer SCI game engine, which, among many other improvements, allowed the game to move from its original 16-color EGA graphics to 256-color VGA. Rebranded Space Quest I: Roger Wilco in the Sarien Encounter to follow the series' new naming convention introduced in Space Quest IV, this version was released on August 20, 1991. In addition to the new VGA graphics, which were drawn in 1950s retrofuturistic B-movie style, it now featured digitized sounds and a new interface, with text-entry being replaced by an icon interface.

When leaving Ulence Flats in the VGA version, the time pod from Space Quest IV appears. Space Quest IV was developed around the same time. However, a continuity error occurs, as the time pod appears in a different place than in Space Quest IV.

Reception

The 1991 remake of the game was reviewed in Dragon, receiving 5 out of 5 stars.

References

External links

1986 video games
1991 video games
Adventure games
Point-and-click adventure games
Amiga games
Apple IIGS games
Atari ST games
DOS games
1980s interactive fiction
Classic Mac OS games
ScummVM-supported games
Sierra Entertainment games
Space Quest
Games commercially released with DOSBox
Video games adapted into comics
Video games developed in the United States